Drogas Light (stylized as DROGAS Light) is the sixth studio album by American rapper Lupe Fiasco, released by 1st and 15th Productions on February 10, 2017. This is also his first album under Thirty Tigers following his departure from Atlantic Records.

Background
Lupe Fiasco announced the album on December 24, 2016, revealing its release date and cover art via Twitter. He confirmed the album's track listing on December 27, which differed from the track listing shared in May 2016.

Fiasco has referred to the project as a "refinement of 'Lasers.' Period". Lupe Fiasco alludes that a lot of the material on DROGAS Light isn't exactly recent. He said it's full of songs "from the vaults" and that there are just "a few new pieces." He reiterates "DROGAS" is coming in the next few months and DROGAS Light is simply the prequel to that project.

The album is part of a planned trilogy of albums, with the following two to be titled Drogas Wave and Skulls.

The album was released February 10 worldwide via digital outlets and physical copies.

The album also marks his first under Thirty Tigers following his departure from record label Atlantic Records.

Critical reception

Drogas Light received mixed reviews from critics. At Metacritic, which assigns a normalized rating out of 100 to reviews from mainstream publications, the album received an average score of 56, based on 11 reviews.

Commercial performance
The album debuted at number 28 on the US Billboard 200 for the chart dated March 4, 2017. selling 20,000 copies (including 14,000 in pure album sales) in its first week.

Track listing
Tracklist adapted from AllMusic and iTunes.

Notes
 "Pick Up the Phone" features uncredited vocals by Sebastian Lundberg.
 "Jump" contains samples of Bla Bla Bla by Gigi D'Agostino

Charts

References

2017 albums
Lupe Fiasco albums
Albums produced by Lupe Fiasco
Albums produced by Symbolyc One